Moqimabad (also Romanized as Moqīmābād) is a village in Chaleh Tarkhan Rural District, Qaleh Now District, Ray County, Tehran Province, Iran. As of 2006 census, its population was 172, with 41 families.

References 

Populated places in Ray County, Iran